Wolfwood is a surname. Notable people with the surname include:

 Theresa Wolfwood, director of the Barnard Boecker Centre Foundation in Victoria, British Columbia, Canada

Fictional characters
 Nicholas D. Wolfwood, a Trigun character

English-language surnames